The Davies Hotel, at 122 N. Main in Lamar, Colorado, was built in 1902.  It was listed on the National Register of Historic Places in 1978.

It is a three-story sandstone building with a flat roof, upon a stone foundation.

It has also been known as the Payne Hotel.

References

Hotels in Colorado
National Register of Historic Places in Prowers County, Colorado
Commercial buildings completed in 1902